Heinz Häussler (born 7 November 1940) is a German former gymnast. He competed at the 1968 Summer Olympics and the 1972 Summer Olympics.

References

External links
 

1940 births
Living people
German male artistic gymnasts
Olympic gymnasts of West Germany
Gymnasts at the 1968 Summer Olympics
Gymnasts at the 1972 Summer Olympics
People from Lindau
Sportspeople from Swabia (Bavaria)